Prosiphneus is an extinct genus of rodent that lived during Miocene to Quaternary of China and Russia.

Further reading
 Prosiphneus at Mikko's phylogeny archive

Miocene rodents
Pliocene rodents
Pleistocene rodents
Spalacidae
Fossils of China